Kevin Dwyer may refer to:

 PK Dwyer, jump blues musician, sometimes credited as Kevin Dwyer
 Kevin Dwyer (cricketer) (1929–2020), New Zealand cricketer
 Kevin Dwyer (politician) (1913–1982), Australian politician